The County Cricket Ground (usually shortened to the County Ground, also known as the Racecourse Ground; currently the Incora County Ground due to sponsorship) is a cricket ground in Derby, England. It has been the home of Derbyshire County Cricket Club since 1871. The ground was first used by South Derbyshire Cricket Club in 1863 and was initially located within Derby Racecourse, although racing ceased after 1939. The ground has staged two One-Day Internationals: New Zealand against Sri Lanka during the 1983 ICC Cricket World Cup and New Zealand against Pakistan during the 1999 ICC Cricket World Cup. It was one of the venues for the 2017 ICC Women's Cricket World Cup, hosting one of the semi-finals.

The ground was also formerly used for football, and was the home of Derby County F.C. between 1884 and 1895. It staged the first ever FA Cup Final match played outside London, a replay of the 1886 Final, and hosted an international match between England and Ireland in 1895.

History
The ground was first used by South Derbyshire Cricket Club in 1863 and was initially located within Derby Racecourse, although racing ceased after 1939.

It also held the games of Derby County Football Club until their move to the Baseball Ground in 1895. The first FA Cup Final outside London was held at the ground in 1886 when Blackburn Rovers beat West Bromwich Albion 2–0 in a replay. England played one football international here, beating Ireland 9–0 in the British Home Championship on 9 March 1895.

The playing area used to feature pitches laid on an east–west axis. Most first-class grounds feature pitches laid north–south to avoid problems with the light from the setting sun. Derbyshire re-laid the pitch on a north–south axis over the 2009/10 winter at a cost of £100,000, ready for the 2010 season. This involved moving some of the floodlights and the electronic scoreboard to suit the new alignment.

In early 2010 a large 1800 seat stand was erected at the Racecourse End of the ground. This stand was taken down in late 2015 in order to make way for a new £2.2 million four-storey media centre, which was completed and officially opened in September 2016. Some 1100 seats were immediately reinstated at the Pavilion End of the ground, with the remaining reinstated next to the new media centre. In February 2017 Derby Civic Society awarded a commendation in the category of Best New Build of 2016 to Derbyshire County Cricket Club for the new media centre.
A new marquee was also built in 2010, which is used for private functions and entertainment during match days.

In February 2016, it was announced that the County Ground would be one of the host venues for the 2017 Women's Cricket World Cup in England. Along with Bristol, Derby hosted one of the semi-finals of the tournament.

Other events
Music concerts have been staged at the ground by Elton John and Boyzone, both in 2017, and Little Mix in 2018.

See also
List of cricket grounds in England and Wales

References

External links

County Cricket Ground, Derby (Derbyshire CCC)
Defunct football venues in England
Derby County F.C. home stadiums
Derbyshire County Cricket Club
FA Cup Final venues
Sports venues in Derby
Sports venues completed in 1863
English Football League venues
1983 Cricket World Cup stadiums
1999 Cricket World Cup stadiums
Football venues in Derbyshire